The 2019 Hellenic Premier League (HPL) was a Twenty20 International (T20I) cricket tournament held in Gouvia, Corfu, Greece between 14 and 19 October 2019. The participating teams were the hosts Greece, along with Bulgaria, Serbia and three Greek club sides (Athens Pak, Corfu Pak and Forge Athens). All of the national teams played their first matches with T20I status during the tournament, following the decision of the International Cricket Council (ICC) to grant full Twenty20 International status to all its members from 1 January 2019.

The international teams competed in one group and the three club sides competed in a second group. The top two sides in the international group played a stand-alone final, that was not part of the HPL, to determine the winner of the international event; Bulgaria defeated Greece in the final by 18 runs.

The group stage was followed by semi-finals and a final for the overall HPL event. Greece defeated Corfu Pak in the first of the semi-finals. In the second semi-final, Forge Athens defeated Bulgaria to join Greece in the final. Greece won the final by 81 runs. Bulgaria won the third-place play-off.

International group

Points table

Fixtures

Club group

Points table

Fixtures

Play-offs

Notes

References

External links
 Series home at ESPN Cricinfo

Associate international cricket competitions in 2019–20
Hellenic Premier League